Turze  (formerly ) is a settlement in the administrative district of Gmina Dębno, within Myślibórz County, West Pomeranian Voivodeship, in north-western Poland.

The settlement has a population of 29.

See also
History of Pomerania

References

Villages in Myślibórz County